The 2014 VTV Awards (Vietnamese: Ấn tượng VTV 2014) is a ceremony honouring the outstanding achievement in television on the Vietnam Television (VTV) network from August 2013 to July 2014. It took place on 5 September 2014 in Hanoi and hosted by Nguyên Khang. This is the first ceremony to be held.

Winners and nominees
(Winners denoted in bold)

Presenters

Special performances

References

External links

2014 television awards
VTV Awards
2014 in Vietnamese television